Stations of the Cross is a 2014 German drama film directed by Dietrich Brüggemann. The film had its premiere in the competition section of the 64th Berlin International Film Festival, where it won the Silver Bear for Best Script.

Plot
Maria (Lea van Acken) is a 14-year-old girl in a family attached to a Traditionalist Catholic organization, who has dedicated her life to serving God. Over the course of 14 long takes, each echoing and named after the Stations of the Cross which Jesus endured on his path to Golgotha, Maria attempts a path of self-inflicted religious ascesis in the hope that God will cure her younger brother of autism.

Cast
 Lea van Acken as Maria
 Franziska Weisz as Mother
 Florian Stetter as Pater Weber
  as Bernadette
  as Christian
 Klaus Michael Kamp as Father
 Georg Wesch as Thomas
 Birge Schade as PE Teacher
  as Doctor
 Hanns Zischler as Funeral Director

Reception
Reception for the film was mostly positive. Rotten Tomatoes gave the film 91% out of 23 votes, with an average rating of 7.4/10. The critics consensus states that the film is "A drama of thought-provoking depth as well as a showcase for newcomer Lea van Acken, Stations of the Cross hits hard and leaves a lingering impact." On Metacritic, the film has a rating of 68 out of 100, from 11 critics, indicating "generally favorable reviews".
Steven Greydanus of Decent Films gave the film an "A−" grade, saying "Stations of the Cross is among the most insightful and devastating cross-examinations of religious fundamentalism that I have ever seen, certainly in a Catholic context. The film is not so much an attack on faith or religion, but an examination of how faith goes wrong."

Notes

References

External links
 
 
 
 
 

2014 films
2014 drama films
German drama films
2010s German-language films
Films about religion
Society of Saint Pius X
2010s German films